Ralph Byrd (April 22, 1909  – August 18, 1952) was an American actor. He was most famous for playing the comic strip character Dick Tracy on screen, in serials, films and television.

Early life and career
The son of George and Edna May Byrd, Ralph Byrd was born in Dayton, Ohio. Before he began acting in films, he sang and danced in theatrical productions.

He served in the United States Army during World War II, having been inducted into the service in San Pedro, California, in 1944.

He married actress and model Virginia Carroll in 1936. The couple remained together until Byrd's death in 1952.

Byrd was a good, all-purpose actor with a gift for delivering dialogue in a natural, ingratiating way. His screen characters could be breezy and affable or tough and authoritative, as the role required. He debuted in movies with a bit part in Red-Headed Woman in (1932).

Once established in Republic Pictures' Dick Tracy serials (beginning in 1937), he was usually cast in action features (as a truck driver, lumberjack, cowboy, etc.), despite not having the usual brawny frame that went with these roles. He had a strong, resolute jaw, however, which gave him a heroic presence. 

Byrd also starred in three other serials: Blake of Scotland Yard (1937), S.O.S. Coast Guard (1937), and The Vigilante (1947).

Dick Tracy
Republic cast Byrd as Chester Gould's comic-strip detective Dick Tracy in the 1937 serial of the same name. The film was so successful that it spawned three sequels (unheard of in serials): Dick Tracy Returns, Dick Tracy's G-Men (featuring a young Jennifer Jones, under her real name of Phylis Isley), and Dick Tracy vs. Crime Inc. (reissued in 1952 as Dick Tracy vs. the Phantom Empire).

RKO Radio Pictures made a feature film, Dick Tracy, in 1945, with Morgan Conway in the title role. After two films, exhibitors complained. To them, Ralph Byrd was Dick Tracy, and only Ralph Byrd would do. RKO capitulated, and hired Byrd to finish the series. Dick Tracy's Dilemma  and Dick Tracy Meets Gruesome were both released in 1947.

Later life and death
Byrd continued to work in action fare in the late 1940s, and when the Dick Tracy property became a TV series in 1950, Byrd was the obvious choice to reprise his most famous role. The shows were produced on low budgets, with Byrd forced to cope with long hours and strenuous action scenes. The accelerated pace of TV production took its toll on the overworked actor's health, and he succumbed to a heart attack in Tarzana, California, on August 18, 1952 and is buried at Forest Lawn Memorial Park (Glendale). He was 43 years old.

Selected filmography

 Red-Headed Woman (1932) as Driver with Mustache (uncredited)
 Chinatown Squad (1935) as Desk Sergeant (uncredited)
 The Adventures of Rex and Rinty (1935, Serial) as Forest Ranger Jerry Morton [Chs. 5-6] (uncredited)
 The Affair of Susan (1935) as Mechanic (uncredited)
 Hell-Ship Morgan (1936) as Dale
 Border Caballero (1936) as Tex Weaver
 Pride of the Marines (1936) as Male Nurse (uncredited)
 The Last Outlaw (1936) as Pilot (uncredited)
 The Final Hour (1936) as Department of Justice Guard (uncredited)
 Two-Fisted Gentleman (1936) as Charley
 Swing Time (1936) as Hotel Clerk (uncredited)
 Alibi for Murder (1936) as Cop (uncredited)
 A Tenderfoot Goes West (1936) as Steve
 White Legion (1936) as NCO Clerk (uncredited)
 We Who Are About to Die (1937) as Police Lab Technician (uncredited)
 Find the Witness (1937) as Tex
 Blake of Scotland Yard (1937) as Dr. Jerry Sheehan
 They Wanted to Marry (1937) as Roger Coleman (uncredited)
 Sea Devils (1937) as Court-Martial Seaman (uncredited)
 Dick Tracy (1937, Serial) as Dick Tracy
 Motor Madness (1937) as C.P.O. Mike Burns
 Criminals of the Air (1937) as Williamson
 They Gave Him a Gun (1937) as Wounded Soldier (uncredited)
 San Quentin (1937) as Cop on Phone (scenes deleted)
 A Fight to the Finish (1937) as Jimmy (uncredited)
 S.O.S. Coast Guard (1937) as Lt. Terry Kent
 The Firefly (1937) as French Lieutenant (uncredited)
 The Trigger Trio (1937) as Larry Smith
 Paid to Dance (1937) as Nickels Brown
 Born to Be Wild (1938) as Steve Hackett
 Army Girl (1938) as Capt. Bob Marvin
 Dick Tracy Returns (1938) as Dick Tracy
 Down in 'Arkansaw' (1938) as John Parker
 Fighting Thoroughbreds (1939) as Ben Marshall
 S.O.S. Tidal Wave (1939) as Jeff Shannon
 Mickey the Kid (1939) as Dr. Ben Cameron
 Dick Tracy's G-Men (1939) as Dick Tracy
 The Captain Is a Lady (1940) as Randy - Seaman (uncredited)
 The Golden Fleecing (1940) as Larry Kelly
 The Howards of Virginia (1940) as James Howard
 Dulcy (1940) as Businessman in Meeting (uncredited)
 Drums of the Desert (1940) as Paul Dumont
 North West Mounted Police (1940) as Constable Ackroyd
 The Mark of Zorro (1940) as Student / Officer (uncredited)
 Dark Streets of Cairo (1940) as Dennis Martin
 The Son of Monte Cristo (1940) as William Gluck
 Misbehaving Husbands (1940) as Bob Grant
 Play Girl (1941) as Miami Doctor (uncredited)
 The Penalty (1941) as Brock
 Power Dive (1941) as Jackson - Draftsman
 Desperate Cargo (1941) as Tony Bronson
 Dr. Kildare's Wedding Day (1941) as Policeman (uncredited)
 Navy Blues (1941) as Lieutenant (uncredited)
 A Yank in the R.A.F. (1941) as Al Bennett
 Dick Tracy vs. Crime Inc. (1941) as Dick Tracy
 Duke of the Navy (1942) as Breezy Duke
 Broadway Big Shot (1942) as Jimmy O'Brien
 Rudyard Kipling's Jungle Book (1942) as Durga
 Moontide (1942) as Rev. Wilson
 Ten Gentlemen from West Point (1942) as Maloney
 Careful, Soft Shoulder (1942) as Elliott Salmon
 Manila Calling (1942) as Corbett
 Time to Kill (1942) as Lou Venter, bodyguard
 Margin for Error (1943) as Pete - Dice-Playing Soldier (uncredited)
 The Meanest Man in the World (1943) as Reporter (uncredited)
 They Came to Blow Up America (1943) as Burkhardt
 Guadalcanal Diary (1943) as Ned Rowman
 December 7th: The Movie (1943) as Reporter (uncredited)
 Four Jills in a Jeep (1944) as Sergeant in Mess Hall (uncredited)
 Tampico (1944) as Quartermaster O'Brien (uncredited)
 Stallion Road (1947) as Richmond Mallard
 Dick Tracy's Dilemma (1947) as Dick Tracy
 The Vigilante (1947) as Greg Sanders / Vigilante
 Dick Tracy Meets Gruesome (1947) as Dick Tracy
 The Argyle Secrets (1948) as Police Lt. Samuel Samson
 Stage Struck (1948) as Police Sgt. Tom Ramey
 Canon City (1948) as Officer Gray
 Jungle Goddess (1948) asBob Simpson
 Thunder in the Pines (1948) as 'Boomer' Benson
 Radar Secret Service (1950) as Static
 Union Station (1950) as Priest (uncredited)
 The Redhead and the Cowboy (1951) as Capt. Andrews
 Lightning Strikes Twice (1951) as Jack Ross, Hair Tonic Salesman on Bus (uncredited)
 Double Crossbones (1951) as Will - Debtor (uncredited)
 Close to My Heart (1951) as Charlie (uncredited)
 My Favorite Spy (1951) as Official (uncredited)
 Bugles in the Afternoon (1952) as First officer (uncredited)

References

External links

 
 

American male film actors
Male film serial actors
1909 births
1952 deaths
Male actors from Dayton, Ohio
20th-century American male actors
Burials at Forest Lawn Memorial Park (Glendale)